Miguel Ángel Benito Díez (born 21 September 1993) is a Spanish former professional racing cyclist, who rode professionally for UCI Professional Continental team , between 2015 and 2018.

Major results

2011
 9th Road race, UEC European Junior Championships
2013
 8th Overall Vuelta Ciclista a León
2017
 8th Overall Colorado Classic

References

External links

1993 births
Living people
Spanish male cyclists
Sportspeople from León, Spain
Cyclists from Castile and León
21st-century Spanish people